The Supreme Court of Justice Hostage Crisis was a 1993 attack in which five gunmen from a group calling itself the "Death Commando" group took over the Costa Rican Supreme Court in San José on April 26 and held 19 supreme court judges (magistrates) and five administrative employees as hostages.

Four days later, after lengthy negotiations, the 24 hostages were freed and the members of the "Death Commando" were taken to an airport where they were going to take an airplane that would take them to Guatemala. The hostage-takers were captured in a spectacular raid before they were able to board the aircraft.

While early suspicions had existed that they were Colombian guerrillas, it transpired that they were actually Costa Ricans and that one of them wanted money for a liver transplant.

References

See also
 List of hostage crises
 Palace of Justice siege

Hostage taking
History of Costa Rica
1993 crimes in Costa Rica
20th century in San José, Costa Rica